Mnichov is a municipality and village in Domažlice District in the Plzeň Region of the Czech Republic. It has about 200 inhabitants.

Administrative parts
Villages of Pivoň and Vranov are administrative parts of Mnichov.

References

Villages in Domažlice District